Thomas Virgil Stallcup (January 3, 1922 – May 2, 1989) was an American professional baseball shortstop who played in seven Major League seasons from 1947 through 1953.

Stallcup attended Clemson University. He was originally signed by the Boston Red Sox before World War II, and was selected by the Cincinnati Reds in the Rule 5 draft after the  season, when Stallcup batted .304 in the Class B Piedmont League. After his debut with the Reds on April 18, 1947, he was sent to the Jersey City Giants for seasoning, and he responded by hitting .338 with 15 home runs in 76 games. From 1948 to 1951, Stallcup was Cincinnati's starting shortstop, but he never batted higher than .254; he twice hit eight home runs in a season. During the 1951 season, he was platooned with 21-year-old Roy McMillan, though he still saw the majority of the action at shortstop. However, the following season, McMillan became the everyday shortstop. Stallcup was traded along with Dick Sisler from the Reds to the St. Louis Cardinals for Wally Westlake and Eddie Kazak on May 13, 1952. He ended his MLB career as a utility infielder. Overall, Stallcup batted .241 with 22 home runs in 587 games.

After briefly managing in minor league baseball, Stallcup left the game. He died at age 67 by suicide in Greenville, South Carolina, by shooting himself in the chest.

Stallcup is featured in Death in Vegas music video for the song Dirge.

References

External links
, or Retrosheet

1922 births
1989 deaths
Anderson Rebels players
Baseball players from North Carolina
Canton Terriers players
Cincinnati Reds players
Columbus Red Birds players
Greensboro Red Sox players
Jersey City Giants players
St. Louis Cardinals players
Major League Baseball shortstops
Minor league baseball managers
Roanoke Red Sox players
Suicides by firearm in South Carolina
Sunbury Redlegs players
Tulsa Oilers (baseball) players
1989 suicides